Bolbe maia is a species of praying mantis in the family Nanomantidae. It is endemic to Australia.

See also
List of Australian stick insects and mantids
Mantodea of Oceania
List of mantis genera and species

References

maia
Mantodea of Oceania
Insects of Australia
Endemic flora of Australia
Insects described in 1923